WVLY may refer to:

 WVLY (AM), a radio station (1370 AM) licensed to Moundsville, West Virginia, United States
 WVLY-FM, a radio station (100.9 FM) licensed to Milton, Pennsylvania, United States